Tyron Bejay (born Win Pyae Aung on 27 November 1993) is a Burmese actor and model. He began his entertainment career in 2014 as a runway model. Tyron gained popularity after starring in the 2018 crime series It was on Yesterday 2.

Early life and education
Tyron Bejay was born on 27 November 1993 in Thanbyuzayat, Mon State, Myanmar to parent Win Tint and his wife Thein Thein Myint. His family moved to Bago when he was only five years old. He is the youngest child among three siblings, having two older sisters. He attended high school at Basic Education High School No. 3 Bago. He was educated in Bago University, majoring in physics.

Career

2014–2016: Beginnings as a model
Tyron began his entertainment career in 2014 as a model and participate in countless advertising shows and runways that had been walked on. And then he competed in the male model contests and became the winner of Mr. Aung Thamardi. Then came the offers for TV commercials and then DVD ones. His hardwork as a model and acting in commercials was noticed by the film industry and soon, film casting offers came rolling in.

Mr Min Chit Thu

2017–present: Acting debut and breaking into the big screen
Tyron contracted for 20 films with Tun Producation in 2017. He made his acting debut in the thriller series It was on Yesterday 2, alongside Kyaw Kyaw Bo, Aung Min Khant, Khar Ra and Aye Myat Thu, aired on MRTV-4 in September 2018. Tyron's portrayal of the character earned praised by fans for her acting performance and character interpretation, and experienced a resurgence of popularity. 
In May 2017, he portrayed the main villain in the big-screen drama Kyway, alongside Hlwan Paing and Ei Chaw Po. The film was based on the novel Pyaw Tine Yone Tak Pote Thin Nyo by Min Lu and directed by Thar Nyi which premiered in Myanmar cinemas on 20 July 2018.

Shortly after, he made his big-screen debut with Ta Ku Latt, where he played the main role with Lin Aung Khit, Aung Lay, Lin Zarni Zaw, Khin Zarchi Kyaw and Myo Thandar Tun, which screened in Myanmar cinemas on 2 November 2018. In 2018, he starred in the action film Thadi Anayel Shi The, where he played the main role with Myint Myat, Yone Lay, Aung Lay and Khin Wint Wah which screened in Myanmar cinemas on 20 June 2019. He then starred in drama Shwe Min Tha Mee Nae Lu Lain (Princess and Crook), where he played the leading role with Yoon Yoon and Zay Ya, aired on Myawaddy TV on 23 March 2018.

The same year, he starred the male lead in the drama film Puyi Tha, alongside Nay Chi Oo, Khine Thin Kyi and Cham Min Ye Htut which screened in Myanmar cinemas on 8 August 2019. The film received critical acclaim and positive reviews for his portrayal of Lu Zaw, which led to increased popularity for him. He has been presenting in a travel documentary called "Let's Go" together with other artists.

In August 2018, it was announced that Tyron has been cast as the male lead in the films Old Gangster, Ser Oak Gyi Si Yin Chat, Nga Mone Tae A Kha Yar, and Joe Yoke.

Filmography

Film (Cinema)
Ta Khu Lat (2018)
Kyway (2018)
Puyi Tha (2019)
Kyauk Kyauk Kyauk 2 (2019)
Players (2020)
Cover (TBA)
Old Gangster (TBA)
Ser Oak Gyi Si Yin Chat (TBA)
Nga Mone Tae A Kha Yar (TBA)
Joe Yoke (TBA)

Television series

References

External links

Living people
1993 births
Burmese male film actors
21st-century Burmese male actors
People from Bago Region
Burmese male models